Master of Community Association Management (MCAM) is a professional certification in property management earned through the California Association of Community Managers (CACM).  Those certified as an MCAM are deemed by the association to have earned a specialty certificate in a management specialization from CACM and have completed requirements which include; six (6) years of good standing as a CCAM, application process, three-part comprehensive assessment exam.  These individuals demonstrate advanced working knowledge of professional competence in the management and administration of common interest developments (also called CIDs), which are generally townhome, condominium or homeowner associations or cooperatives.

External links
 California Association of Community Managers Website
 California Association of Community Managers MCAM Certification Webpage

Property management
Professional titles and certifications